Fenech is a surname about whose origins there are several hypotheses. The most notable is the meaning of "rabbit", since  is rabbit in Maltese. This in turn comes from the Arabic word for fox,  ("fennec fox") which like the rabbit has large ears as its distinguishing feature and may have been confused during the development of the Maltese language, which is a descendant of the Siculo-Arabic dialect. A possible Iranian derivation of the word has also been suggested.

"Phoenician" variation
Another variation is formed from the word Phoenicians. In fact, some bearers of this surname use the horse, a Phoenician symbol, on their crest rather than the rabbit.

"Fenwick" variation
Another variation is an Anglo-Saxon one where it is derived from a family living in Fenwick, which was in Northumberland and the West Riding of Yorkshire. This name was originally derived from the English fenn which means "marsh" and wic, which means "a farm". The surname Fenwick is still widely found in northern England and has spread through most English-speaking countries.

Notable people
Chantal Bondin, née Fenech (born 1980), Maltese footballer
David Fenech (born 1969), French musician
Eddie Fenech Adami (born 1934), Prime Minister of Malta
Edwige Fenech (born 1948), Maltese-Italian actress and producer
Francis Fenech (1892–1969), Maltese prelate who became a bishop in India
Georges Fenech (born 1954), French politician
Jeff Fenech (born 1964), Maltese-Australian boxer
Mario Fenech (born 1961), Maltese-Australian rugby player
Paul Fenech (born 1972), Maltese-Australian comedian
Paul Fenech (footballer) (born 1986), Maltese footballer
Ryan Fenech (born 1986), Maltese footballer
Tonio Fenech (born 1969), Finance Minister of Malta
Yorgen Fenech (born 1981), Maltese businessman

See also
Fenech (disambiguation)

References

Maltese-language surnames